Frank Hartley (20 July 1896 – 20 October 1965) was an English professional footballer who played for Oxford City, Tottenham Hotspur, Corinthian and represented England at international level.

Football career
Hartley began his career at Oxford City before joining Tottenham Hotspur in 1922 and played in one match. After a spell with the Corinthians, the inside forward re-joined the Spurs to go on and make a further six appearances and scoring once between 1927–29.

International career 
Hartley made one international appearance for England in a friendly against France on 10 May 1923.

References 

1896 births
People from West Oxfordshire District
English footballers
England international footballers
English Football League players
Oxford City F.C. players
Corinthian F.C. players
Tottenham Hotspur F.C. players
1965 deaths
English cricketers
Oxfordshire cricketers
Minor Counties cricketers
Association football inside forwards